Annice (died August 23, 1828) was the first female slave known to have been executed in Missouri. She was hanged for the murders of five children, two of whom were her own.

Annice was owned by Jeremiah Prior of Clay County, Missouri. On July 27, 1828, she was indicted for the murders of five slave children also owned by Prior – Ann, Billy, Nancy, Nelly, and Phebe. Billy (aged five) and Nancy (aged two) were Annice's own children, but the parentages and ages of the others were not identified. According to the indictment, she pushed the children "into a certain collection of water of the depth of five feet and there choaked , suffocated and drowned, of which they instantly died". Annice was given a jury trial and a defense attorney, but was found guilty. She was publicly hanged by Sheriff Shubael Allen the following month, at the county seat of Liberty. Hers was the first legal execution in Clay County (established 1822), and she is the first enslaved woman known to have been executed in Missouri.

One author has suggested that by killing the children Annice was "depriving her owner of no fewer than five potentially valuable properties", thus striking out against "the curse of involuntary servitude". Annice is the only slave known to have been executed for infanticide in Missouri, but a number of other instances have been found in other states. Enslaved women believed that by killing their children they were sparing them a lifetime of subjugation. There has been some speculation that Annice was the mother of another female slave of the same name, who was lynched in Clay County in 1850 for the attempted murder of her owner. However, there is no direct evidence linking the two other than their shared names and location. In 1976, Clay County erected a memorial plaque at Tryst Falls (near Excelsior Springs), identifying it as the location of the drownings. The plaque was modified a few decades later to remove the specific details of Annice's actions.

See also
Mary (slave), youngest person executed in Missouri
State of Missouri v. Celia, a Slave

References

1828 deaths
19th-century American slaves
People executed by Missouri by hanging
American mass murderers
American murderers of children
American female murderers
Executed American women
Executed mass murderers
People from Clay County, Missouri
Executed African-American people
19th-century executions by the United States
19th-century executions of American people
1828 murders in the United States
1828 in Missouri
American people executed for murder
Year of birth unknown